The Air Force Cost Analysis Agency (AFCAA) performs independent component cost analyses for major Air Force system programs as required by public law and Department of Defense policy, or those of special interest. It is responsible for cost estimating and for enhancing the state-of-the-art in cost analysis. It provides guidance, analytical support, and quantitative risk analyses to 11 major commands and the Air Force corporate staff on development of cost per flying-hour factors and resource requirements. AFCAA performs special studies supporting long-range planning, force structure, Analysis of Alternatives, and life-cycle cost analyses.

References

Notes

Bibliography

 Air Force Historical Research Agency AFCAA Page

See also

Cost Analysis Agency
Military in Virginia